Robert Nixon may refer to:
 Bob Nixon (Zimbabwean politician), Zimbabwean politician
 Robert A. Nixon (1900–1948), American politician
 Robert Nixon (politician) (born 1928), retired Canadian politician
 Robert Nixon (comics) (1939–2002), British comics artist
 Robert Nixon (prophet), 15th or 17th century prophet in Cheshire, England
 Robert Samuel Nixon (1909–1998), MP in the Northern Ireland Parliament for North Down
 Robert Nixon (serial killer) (died 1939), American serial killer
 Robert Nixon (filmmaker) (born 1954), American filmmaker